Eligio Silvestre Echagüe Delgado (31 December 1938 – 6 December 2009) was a former football defender; most commonly playing in the left-back position.

Career
Echagüe started his career at Club Adolfo Riquelme from his hometown, Concepción. In 1947, he was transferred to Olimpia Asunción and made his debut in the first team squad in 1950. He was part of the Olimpia team that won five consecutive titles coached then by the great Aurelio González. Echagüe played for the Paraguay national football team in several occasions, most notably in the 1958 FIFA World Cup.

Titles

References

1938 births
2009 deaths
People from Concepción, Paraguay
Paraguayan footballers
Club Olimpia footballers
Paraguay international footballers
1958 FIFA World Cup players
Association football defenders